A StoryBots Christmas is a children's animated holiday special based on the characters from the digital educational program StoryBots and the original television series Ask the StoryBots and StoryBots Super Songs. It was created and produced by JibJab Bros. Studios (now StoryBots Inc.) and premiered exclusively on Netflix on December 1, 2017. It received six nominations for the 45th Daytime Emmy Awards and won two, including for Outstanding Special Class Animated Program.

The special features an appearance by Ed Asner as Santa Claus. He received an Emmy nomination for the role.

Plot 
Bo mistakenly thinks that her friends do not like her gifts, so she heads to the North Pole to ask Santa Claus for help making awesome presents for her friends. She learns along the way that Christmas is about something far more than presents.

Cast 
 Judy Greer as Beep
 Ed Asner as Santa Claus
 Erin Fitzgerald as Bo
 Fred Tatasciore as Bang
 Jeff Gill as Bing
 Gregg Spiridellis as Boop
 Evan Spiridellis as Hap
Nate Theis as Hub and Bub

Reception 
A StoryBots Christmas received positive reviews. Common Sense Media gave it a five-star review, calling it a "dynamic and positive special [that] highlights the importance of sharing time with loved ones during the holidays." The Star Tribune also named it a top TV pick and praised it as a "silly but charming animated special."

Accolades

Music 
A StoryBots Christmas: Music from the Original Special was released on December 8, 2017 on all major digital music platforms, including iTunes, Spotify, Apple Music and Amazon Music. The music release includes the original song "Sharing Christmas (With the Ones You Love)" from the television special, as well as "Crazy for Christmastime" from the StoryBots short-form video.

References 

2010s American television specials
2017 television specials
Animated television specials
Christmas television specials
Santa Claus in television
Netflix specials
American Christmas television specials
2010s animated television specials